The 17th Annual Japan Record Awards took place at the Imperial Garden Theater in Chiyoda, Tokyo, on December 31, 1975, starting at 7:00PM JST. The primary ceremonies were televised in Japan on TBS.

Award winners

Japan Record Award
Akira Fuse for "Shikuramen No Kahori"
 Lyricist: Kei Ogura
 Composer: Kei Ogura
 Arranger: Mitsuo Hagida
 Record Company: King Records

Best Vocalist
Hiroshi Itsuki for "Chikuma Gawa" 
Awarded again after last year, second-best vocalist award.

Best New Artist
Takashi Hosokawa for "Kokoro No Kori"

Vocalist Award
 Rumiko Koyanagi for "Hanaguruma"
 Awarded again after 3 years, 2nd vocalist award.
 Goro Noguchi for "Shitetsu Ensen"
 Saori Minami for "Hito Koi Shikute"

New Artist Award
 Hiromi Iwasaki for "Romance"
 Hiromi Ōta for "Ame Dare"
 Junko Ogawa for "Yoru No Houmonsha"
 Nagisa Katahira for "Utsukushii Chigiri"

General Public Award
 Sakurada Junko for "Juushichi No Natsu" and other hit songs.

Composer Award
Kouichi Morita for "Geshukuya"	
Singer: Kouichi Morita & Topgalant

Arranger Award
Mitsuo Hagita for "Soratobu Kujira"
Singer: Chan Chako

Lyricist Award
Yū Aku for "Uba Guruma"
Awarded again after 2 years, second lyricist award.
Singer: Sugawara Yoichi

Special Award
 Chiyoko Shimakura 
Awarded again after 7 years, second special award.
 Frank Nagai 
Yoshio Tabata
Yūjirō Ishihara
Awarded again after 8 years, second special award.

Planning Award
 EMI Music Japan for "Minato No Yoko.Yokohama.Yokosuka" 
Awarded again after 5 years, fifth planning award.
 Isao Tomita and BMG JAPAN for "Mussorgsky/Tenrankai No E"

Shinpei Nakayama Award & Yaso Saijō Award
 Kei Ogura

Best 10 JRA Nominations
5 singers will be chosen for the vocalist award, and the JRA and best vocalist will be chosen from the 5 vocalists that receive the vocalist award.

External links
Official Website

Japan Record Awards
Japan Record Awards
Japan Record Awards
Japan Record Awards
1975